Sean O'Sullivan (born 29 April 1994) is an English professional snooker player.

Career

O'Sullivan turned professional in 2012 after qualifying via Event 2 of the Q School and gained a two-year tour card for the 2012–13 and 2013–14 snooker seasons. In the event, he beat Christopher Keogan 4–1, Nick Dyson 4–0, Mohammed Al Shaikh from Bahrain 4–1 and Michael Wild 4–3, before seeing off Ryan Causton 4–1 in the quarter-finals.

Debut season
O'Sullivan lost his first nine matches as a professional, picking up his first victory in the minor-ranking European Tour Event 3 by beating David Gilbert 4–3, before losing 4–2 to Jimmy Robertson. The tournament formed part of the Players Tour Championship events, with O'Sullivan playing in all ten tournaments, finishing 98th on the Order of Merit.

His best run of results came in qualifying for the China Open, where he defeated Craig Steadman and Alfie Burden, but then lost 5–3 to Rory McLeod. O'Sullivan's season ended when he was beaten 10–6 by Michael Wasley in the first round of World Championship Qualifying. He finished his first year on tour ranked world number 91.

2013/2014 season
O'Sullivan's only win at the venue stage of a ranking event during the 2013–14 season came at the UK Championship when he defeated Anthony Hamilton 6–4, before losing by a reverse of this scoreline to Noppon Saengkham in the second round. He dropped off the tour at the end of the season as he was ranked world number 102, well outside of the top 64 who retain their places. O'Sullivan entered Q School in a bid to win his place back, but lost in the last 32 in both events.

2014/2015 season
At the Riga Open in August 2014, O'Sullivan reached his first quarter-final in a professional event with wins over Jamie Burnett, Mark Joyce, Jak Jones and Mark Davis, before he was beaten 4–0 by Mark Allen. He also played in all three of the Asian Tour events and, thanks to a last 16 showing in the Xuzhou Open, he finished 22nd on the Asian Order of Merit which has earned him a new two-year main snooker tour card for the 2015–16 and 2016–17 seasons.

2015/2016 season
O'Sullivan dropped just two frames in reaching the last 16 of the Paul Hunter Classic where he lost 4–0 to Michael Holt. He would ultimately finish 38th on the European Order of Merit. In the main ranking events he qualified for the International Championship courtesy of a 6–3 win over Robin Hull, but lost 6–0 to Anthony McGill in the first round. O'Sullivan made five breaks of 50 or above to eliminate Kurt Maflin 6–3 in the first round of the UK Championship, before being defeated 6–4 by Matthew Selt. He could only win one more match after this and lost 10–5 to Ross Muir in the first round of World Championship qualifying.

2016/2017 season

A 4–1 win over Yu Delu qualified O'Sullivan for the 2016 Riga Masters and he beat Luca Brecel 4–0, before being unable to pick up a frame himself in the second round against David Gilbert. After losing eight of his next nine matches he knocked out Robbie Williams, Mark King and Mitchell Mann at the Scottish Open all by 4–1 scorelines to reach the last 16 of a ranking event for the first time. O'Sullivan led Yu 3–2, but lost 4–3. O'Sullivan entered Q School at the end of the season in order to attempt to remain on the tour. He lost 4–0 to Allan Taylor in the final round of the first event and 4–3 to Paul Davison in the fourth round of the second, but had done enough to earn a new tour card through the Q School Order of Merit.

Performance and rankings timeline

Career finals

Amateur finals: 1 (1 title)

References

External links 

 
 
Sean O'Sullivan at worldsnooker.com

1994 births
Living people
English snooker players
People from Whitechapel